Since 2014, the Metropolitan Police Service has identified a significant increase in moped enabled crimes. These are robberies committed by offenders riding mopeds and other vehicles such as motorised scooters.

Statistics
Moped theft (theft of motor vehicle) and mobile enabled crimes (robbery with force) are recorded separately throughout the justice system. Q3 2020/21 showed all taking of motor vehicle theft had reduced by 17% and total robbery was down 31% in London. It must be noted that COVID-19 would have had an impact on recorded data over the period.

Official figures back in 2016/17 revealed more than 19,385 moped enabled crimes in London, but the figures are often inflated for exciting headlines in the local media. In May 2017 the London Evening Standard claimed that at least 50,000 crimes had been committed by gangs using stolen scooters, mopeds, motorcycles and bikes. In the article, it was claimed that the vehicles were often hijacked in Outer London boroughs such as Barking and Dagenham and used to commit robberies in the West End of London. The article claims that statistics released by the Metropolitan Police revealed that up to 1,500 scooters or motorcycles were being stolen in London each month. In the previous twelve months 13,005 thefts were reported, a 41 per cent increase over the previous period.

Incidents (as reported by UK and local press)
In October 2016 a man was sentenced after stealing 21 mobile phones in one hour. Offences on mopeds have been reported across London. Local free newspaper, the Metro, reported an offender threatening victims in Battersea with a machete and wielding hammers during daylight robberies in Great Portland Street near Broadcasting House.
April–May 2017: Between 18 April and 5 May 2017 a gang of three youths aged 15, 16 and 17 committed at least 103 moped-enabled offences in the Central London boroughs of Camden, Islington, Kensington and Chelsea and Westminster. They were later arrested by police and pleaded guilty at the Southwark Crown Court. Two of the boys also admitted breaching criminal behaviour orders which prohibited them from riding mopeds.
Thursday 13 July 2017: Five people in Central London boroughs were attacked with acid during a 72-minute period. The victims were riding mopeds, one as a delivery driver for Deliveroo and another for Uber Eats, before being attacked with the acid and having their mopeds hijacked. One victim suffered "life-changing" injuries.
Friday 14 July 2017: A man riding a moped had a "noxious substance", also believed to be acid, thrown at him by two males on another moped in Dagenham.
Saturday 15 July 2017: A man was stabbed to death, with gunshots also being fired, by attackers on mopeds who demanded his phone in King William Walk, Greenwich.
Sunday 16 July 2017: A teenager, riding a stolen moped, was critically injured after a collision involving a police car in Wimbledon. Two other teenagers who were also riding the moped were injured, one seriously. Police had been following the moped with the assistance of the National Police Air Service after earlier reports of an attempted robbery. Police allegedly discovered two knives at the scene. The teenager who was critically injured subsequently died.

Response
On Tuesday 18 July 2017 moped and motorcycle delivery drivers held a protest in Parliament Square concerning the recent rise in attacks on riders; including hijackings and acid attacks.

On Friday 8 September 2017 The London Mayor, Sadiq Khan, launched a "zero-tolerance approach to moped crime", a collaboration between police, local authorities and the Motorcycle Crime Prevent Community (which represents motorcycle users) to help tackle moped-related crime in London.

References

2010s in London
Crime in London